Fatma Zahra Djouad (born ) is an Algerian female volleyball player. She was part of the Algeria women's national volleyball team.

She participated in the 2013 FIVB Volleyball World Grand Prix.
On club level she played for MBBEJAIA in 2013.

References

External links
 Profile at FIVB.org

1988 births
Living people
Algerian women's volleyball players
Place of birth missing (living people)
Volleyball players from Béjaïa
Wing spikers
21st-century Algerian people